Gil Peñalosa is a well known urbanist, and founder and chair of the non-profit 8 80 Cities. Following his second-place finish in the 2022 Toronto mayoral election, Penalosa announced he will run again in the 2023 Toronto mayoral by-election. He is running to be mayor of Toronto. Penalosa has been interviewed by a number of Canadian broadcasters including the CBC and Toronto Star.

Accomplishments and Past Roles 
Penalosa has twice served as the chair for World Urban Parks and acted as its first Ambassador.

Policy Positions

Housing 
Penalosa has proposed a number of policy solutions to address Toronto's housing crisis. Penalosa is an advocate for city density and "wants to give homeowners the right to legally create up to six units in their homes." Penalosa aims to legalize rooming houses.

Election Results 
2022 Toronto mayoral election

External links 

 8 80 Cities

Canadian urban planners